The G. D. Naidu Industrial Exhibition is an industrial exhibition founded by scientist and politician from Coimbatore, G. D. Naidu. Nearby, there is a technical institute started by him. Automobile, industrial and mechanical exhibits are present for viewing at the exhibition.

References 

 

Trade fairs in India
Economy of Coimbatore
Tourist attractions in Coimbatore
Museums in Coimbatore